Conasprella nereis is a species of sea snail, a marine gastropod mollusk in the family Conidae, the cone snails and their allies.

Description
"Shell of Conasprella nereis is thin delicate smooth and glossy, its outline straight-sided and elongate; the shoulder is smooth, sharp and distinctly carinate with a small groove just anterior to the shoulder carina. The anterior one-third of the shell has six to eight wide and deeply incised spiral sulci. Shell colour is pale blue-white with three light brown bands: one just anterior to the shoulder, one at mid-body and one anterior to the mid-body line. Three to four rows of alternating brown and white dashes between brown bands: dashes are rectangular-shaped, giving the shell a checkerboard effect. Spire colour is white with alternating dark brown, crescent-shaped brown flammules, said flammules extending from the suture across the shoulder, on to the body whorl, producing a pattern of alternating white and dark brown dashes along the shoulder carina. The aperture of the shell is pale lilac, and its periostracum is thin, smooth and translucent yellow-brown."
The length of the shell varies between three 19 mm and 27 mm.

Distribution
Locus typicus: "Approximately 250 metres depth off Panglao,
Bohol Isl., Philippines."

This marine species occurs off the Philippines and in the Makassar Strait.

Habitat
"Like Conus aphrodite and Conus boholensis, Conus nereis is a member 
of the mud bottom community that borders the Philippine Trenches. 
It is sympatric with the same gastropods."

https://en.wikipedia.org/wiki/Philippine_Trench

References

 Petuch, Edward J. "Twelve new Indo-Pacific gastropods." Nemouria 23 (1979): 1-21.
 Monnier E., Limpalaër L., Robin A. & Roux C. (2018). A taxonomic iconography of living Conidae. Harxheim: ConchBooks. 2 vols. 1205 pp. page(s): 194

External links
 Gastropods.com: Conasprella (Conasprella) nereis

nereis
Gastropods described in 1979